Grey willow or gray willow may refer to:

Salix atrocinerea, a species of willow native to Europe commonly called grey willow
Salix cinerea, a species of willow native to Europe and western Asia, also occasionally called grey sallow
Salix glauca, a species of willow native to northern North America, Europe and Asia